The 2021–22 Liga I (also known as Casa Liga 1 for sponsorship reasons) was the 104th season of the Liga I, the top professional league for Romanian association football clubs. The season started on 15 July 2021 and ended in May 2022. It was the sixth to take place since the play-off/play-out format has been introduced, and CFR Cluj was four-time defending champion.

After the conclusion of the regular season, teams were divided according to their place to enter either the championship play-offs or the relegation play-outs.

The teams ranked 15th and 16th at the end of the play-out tournament were directly relegated, while the 13th and 14th places played a promotion/relegation play-off against 3rd and 4th places from Liga II.

Teams
The league consistsed of 16 teams: 12 from the 2020–21 Liga I, two teams from the 2020–21 Liga II, and the winners of the 2020–21 promotion/relegation play-off.

Teams promoted to the Liga I

The first club to be promoted was FC U Craiova, following their 0–0 draw against Miercurea Ciuc on 13 May 2021. FC U Craiova returned in the Liga I after 10 years of absence.

The second club to be promoted was Rapid București, following their 1–3 defeat against FC U Craiova on 17 May 2021. Rapid returned in the Liga I after 6 years of absence.

The third club to be promoted was Mioveni, following their 2–1 win against Hermannstadt on 2 June 2021, in the promotion/relegation play-offs. Mioveni returned in the Liga I after 9 years of absence.

Teams relegated to the Liga II

The first club to be relegated was Politehnica Iași, which were relegated on 15 May 2021 following a 0–1 defeat against Hermannstadt, ending their 7-year stay in the top flight.

The second club to be relegated was Astra Giurgiu, which were relegated on 19 May 2021 following their 0–1 defeat against Viitorul Constanța, ending their 12-year stay in the top flight.

The third club to be relegated was Hermannstadt, which were relegated on 2 June 2021 following their 1–2 defeat against Mioveni in the promotion/relegation play-offs, thus ending their 3-year stay in the top flight.

Other changes

In June 2021, Gheorghe Hagi (owner of Viitorul Constanța), chairman Gheorghe Popescu and Farul Constanța owner Ciprian Marica announced in a press conference that their two clubs have merged; second division club Farul Constanța therefore took Viitorul's place in the first league from the 2021–22 Liga I season.

Venues

Personnel and kits

Note: Flags indicate national team as has been defined under FIFA eligibility rules. Players and Managers may hold more than one non-FIFA nationality.

Managerial changes

Regular season
In the regular season the 16 teams will meet twice for a total of 30 matches per team, with the top 6 advancing to the Championship play-offs and the bottom 10 qualifying for the relegation play-outs.

Table

Results

Play-off round
The top six teams from Regular season will meet twice (10 matches per team) for places in 2022–23 UEFA Champions League and 2022–23 UEFA Europa Conference League as well as deciding the league champion. Teams start the Championship round with their points from the Regular season halved, rounded upwards, and no other records carried over from the Regular season.

Play-off table

Play-out round
The bottom ten teams from the regular season meet once to contest against relegation. Teams started the play-out round with their points from the Regular season halved, rounded upwards, and no other records carried over from the Regular season. The winner of the Relegation round finish 7th in the overall season standings, the second placed team – 8th, and so on, with the last placed team in the Relegation round being 16th.

Play-out table

European play-offs
In the semi-final, the 7th and 8th-placed teams of the Liga I typically play a one-legged match on the ground of the better placed team (7th place). However the 7th place team, Sepsi, has already qualified to the Europa Conference League as Romanian Cup winners, so the semi-final was not played. In the final, the 8th place team will play the team ranked in the last UEFA Europa Conference League spot in the play-off tournament. The winner of the final will enter the second qualifying round of the UEFA Europa Conference League.

European play-off final

Promotion/relegation play-offs
The 13th and 14th-placed teams of the Liga I faces the 3rd and 4th-placed team of the Liga II.

First leg

Second leg

Season statistics

Top scorers

Hat-tricks

Notes
(H) – Home team(A) – Away team

Top assists

Clean sheets

Gazeta Sporturilor Monthly Football Awards

Player of the Month

Manager of the Month

Discipline

Team

Champion squad

Awards

Liga I Team of the Season

References

External links
 

2021-22
2021–22 in Romanian football
ro